Bolle Willum Luxdorph (24 July 1716 – 13 August 1788) was a Danish government official, historian, writer and book collector.

Early life and education
Luddorph was born on 24 July 1817 in Copenhagen, the son of colonel Christian Luxdorph (1684–1726) and Susanne Magdalene Worm (1680–1735). His paternal grandfather was Bolle Luxdorph. His father owned Mørup Manor.

Book collection
Luxdorph left a book collection of 15,000 volumes. It was sold at auction after his death. The books feature his exlibris. Many of them are now in the Royal Danish Library.

Personal life

Luxdorph married Anna Bolette de Junge (1719–1781), a daughter of Severin de J. (1680–1757) and Catharine Wissing (1693–1724), on 14 June 1748.

He owned a country house in Nærum later known as the Hartmann House after a later owner. He died on 13 August 1788 and is buried in Trinitatis Church.

References

Further reading
 Petersen B., Lise-Lotte; Jeune, Bernard: Icons of Longevity: Luxdorphs Eighteenth Century Gallery of Long-livers, Syddansk Universitetsforlag (2011)
 
 Luxdorphs dagbøger

Danish civil servants
18th-century Danish writers
Danish book and manuscript collectors
1716 births
1788 deaths